Lake Lewis was a large transient lake (lasting only days to weeks) in the Pacific Northwest region of North America, formed by periodic Missoula Floods along the Columbia River paleocourse between 21,000 and 16,000 years ago.

Lake Lewis was formed when the restricted flow of waters from periodic cataclysmic floods from Glacial Lake Missoula, pluvial Lake Bonneville, and perhaps from subglacial outbursts, backed up through the constriction formed by the Wallula Gap in the Horse Heaven Hills (southern Washington). Water also backed up further downstream on the Columbia River between Washington and Oregon, delaying the drainage of Lake Lewis. The water remained for a period of weeks before the flood waters drained through Wallula Gap, just southeast of the Tri-Cities area.

Lake Lewis also flooded the Yakima, Walla Walla, Touchet and Tucannon river valleys.

Evidence for Lake Lewis

Wallula Gap

Wallula Gap is a large water gap through basalt anticlines in the Columbia River basin just south of the confluence of the Walla Walla River and the Columbia River. The Wallula Gap, which has existed for many millions of years, was widened by the prehistoric flow of the Salmon-Snake and Columbia Rivers combined with the glacial waters that poured across the Channeled Scablands during the Missoula Floods. The Wallula Gap constrained the flow such that less than 1/5 of the 800 km³ of water per day entering could be discharged. As a result, the floods filled the Pasco Basin and formed, for a short period, Lake Lewis. The large volumes of flood water passing through the gap contributed substantially to the erosion of the gap, as is evidenced by the shear walls and of scab-features such as the "Sisters."

Touchet Formation

Lake Lewis backflooded into the Yakima, Walla Walla, Touchet and Tucannon River Valleys. In these relatively calm arms of the lake, the slackwaters were thick with suspended materials eroded from the scablands above. Some of the suspended materials settled out, creating thick Touchet Formation layers which are found throughout these valleys.

Glacial erratics

There were several long ridges (Saddle Mountains, Frenchman Hills, and Rattlesnake Mountain) that were above flood level. Peaks like the Badger, Candy, and Red Mountains were islands. At this level, much of the Columbia Basin would have been submerged.

References

External links
 
 

Lewis, Lake
Lewis, Lake Lewis
Geology of Washington (state)